Winkelbury Hill is a 62.95 hectare biological Site of Special Scientific Interest in Wiltshire, notified in 1971.

View of Winkelbury from the west

Sources
 English Nature citation sheet for the site (accessed 8 August 2006)
 Wiltshire Community History on GovUk
Winklebury Hill SSSIon Natural England

External links
 English Nature website (SSSI information)
 The Modern Antiquarian web site

Sites of Special Scientific Interest in Wiltshire
Sites of Special Scientific Interest notified in 1971